Noor Hussaim ( – 15 February 2020) was a Bangladeshi lawyer and politician from Jessore belonging to  Bangladesh Jamaat-e-Islami. He was a member of the Jatiya Sangsad.

Biography
Hussain had been working as a lawyer since 1975. He was elected as a member of the Jatiya Sangsad from Jessore-1 in 1986.

Hussain died on 15 February 2020 at the age of 90.

References

1930s births
2020 deaths
20th-century Bangladeshi lawyers
3rd Jatiya Sangsad members
People from Jessore District
Bangladesh Jamaat-e-Islami politicians
21st-century Bangladeshi lawyers